"All Aboard" is a R&B song by Romeo Santos, featuring Lil Wayne, from Santos' debut album Fórmula, Vol. 1 (2011). The track was co-written and produced by Rico Love. It was released as the album's fourth single.

Background
After the temporary separation of the band Aventura, Romeo Santos signed a record deal with Sony Music Latin and recorded his debut studio album, Formula, Vol. 1, which includes most of the tracks in bachata rhythm and bilingual songs such as the lead single "You", which peaked at number-one in the Billboard Latin Songs, and "Promise", with vocals by American singer Usher.

Chart performance

References

2011 songs
2012 singles
Lil Wayne songs
Romeo Santos songs
Songs written by Rico Love
Songs written by Romeo Santos
Songs written by Pierre Medor
Sony Music Latin singles
Contemporary R&B ballads